Brooke Miller (born 4 May 1998) is an Australian soccer player, who played for Newcastle Jets in the Australian W-League.

Playing career

Club

Newscastle Jets, 2015–
Miller signed with Newcastle Jets in 2014. She made her debut for the team during a match against Western Sydney Wanderers on 19 October 2014. Newcastle finished in fifth place with a  record. Returning in the 2015–16 W-League season, Miller made four appearances for Newcastle and helped the team finish in sixth place with a  record.

In December 2016, it was announced she would return to the Jets for the 2016–17 W-League season.

International 
Miller has represented Australia on the under-17 and  under-20 national teams.

See also

References

Further reading
 Grainey, Timothy (2012), Beyond Bend It Like Beckham: The Global Phenomenon of Women's Soccer, University of Nebraska Press, 
 Stewart, Barbara (2012), Women's Soccer: The Passionate Game, Greystone Books, 

1998 births
Living people
Australian women's soccer players
Newcastle Jets FC (A-League Women) players
A-League Women players
Women's association football midfielders